Fuzzy Warbles Volume 3 is the third volume in the Fuzzy Warbles series, released in February 2003. The Fuzzy Warbles Series brings together demos, rarities and side projects from XTC founding member Andy Partridge.

Track listing
All songs written by Andy Partridge, except where noted.

 "My Train Is Coming" – 2:43
 "Lightheaded" – 3:29
 "Goodbye Humanosaurus" – 3:11
 "Humble Daisy" – 3:15
 "You Like Me?" – 4:45
 "Great Fire" – 3:38
 "Work" – 3:03
 "Mopti Fake 1" – 0:58
 "Collideascope" – 3:00
 "Mopti Fake 2" – 1:03
 "When We Get to England" – 2:17
 "Train Running Low on Soul Coal" – 4:18
 "Holly Up on Poppy" – 3:02
 "Strawberry Fields Forever" (Lennon/McCartney) – 4:01
 "Autumn Comes Around" – 1:05
 "Child's Crusade" – 2:38
 "Little Lighthouse" – 5:15
 "This Is the End" – 5:05
 "Put It on Again" – 0:55

Personnel
Andy Partridge – instruments and vocals on all tracks
Dave Gregory – All instrument and backing vocals on 14, recording engineer of 14
Erica Wexler – Suzy Wong voice on 5

Credits
All songs were recorded at Andy's home except 14 at Dave's home.
Mastered by Ian Cooper at Metropolis Mastering, London
Sleeve art by Andrew Swainson

Andy Partridge albums
Demo albums
2003 compilation albums